741 may refer to:
 741 was a year in the 8th century.
 741 (number)
 741 BC, a year in the 8th century BC
 The 741 operational amplifier integrated circuit